The Don River is a perennial river of the Port Phillip catchment, located in the Central region of the Australian state of Victoria.

Location and features
The Don River rises below Mount Toolebewong, part of the Yarra Ranges of the Great Dividing Range, in remote country within the Yarra Ranges National Park. The river flows generally south by west before reaching its confluence with the Yarra River near .

See also

References 

Melbourne Water catchment
Rivers of Greater Melbourne (region)
Western District (Victoria)